Maclurodendron porteri is a tree in the family Rutaceae.

Description
The wood is locally used in construction.

Distribution and habitat
Maclurodendron porteri grows naturally in Burma, Thailand, Sumatra, Peninsular Malaysia, Singapore, Borneo and the Philippines. Its habitat is forests from sea-level to  altitude.

Taxonomy
It was first described in 1875 as Acronychia porteri by Joseph Dalton Hooker, but in 1982 was assigned to the genus, Maclurodendron by Thomas Gordon Hartley.

References

porteri
Trees of Myanmar
Trees of Thailand
Trees of Malesia
Plants described in 1875
Taxa named by Joseph Dalton Hooker